Aspergillus zonatus is a species of fungus in the genus Aspergillus which has been isolated from forest soil in Costa Rica. Aspergillus zonatus produces azonalenin and aszonapyrone A

References

Further reading
 
 
 
 

zonatus
Fungi described in 1965